Jefferson Theater may refer to:

Jefferson Theater (Punxsutawney, Pennsylvania), historic theatre building
Jefferson Theater (Virginia), a performing venue in Charlottesville, Virginia
Jefferson Theatre, a performing venue in Beaumont, Texas